Castiglione was a  74-gun ship of the line of the French Navy.

Career 
Ordered on 4 January 1807, Castiglione was one of the ships built in the various shipyards that the First French Empire captured in Holland and Italy. The Empire used the shipyards in a crash programme to rebuild the French Navy.

The French surrendered Castiglione to Austria at the fall of Venice on 20 April 1814. An accidental fire on 14 September destroyed her.

Notes, citations, and references

Notes

Citations

References
 
 

Ships of the line of the French Navy
Téméraire-class ships of the line
1812 ships